KD No:1 is a 1978 Indian Telugu-language action film co-written and directed by K. Raghavendra Rao. The film stars N. T. Rama Rao and Jayasudha, with music composed by K. V. Mahadevan. It is a remake of the Hindi film Dus Numbri (1976). The film ran for over 100 days in theatres.

Plot 
Krishna, notorious as KD No.1, is one that intimidates gangsters. He is in search of a gang circulating fake currency by which his family esteem is denounced. As a result, his father, Inspector Rama Rao (Mikkilineni), is sentenced, and his mother, Shantamma (Anjali Devi), is suffering in the mental hospital. Once, Krishna gets acquainted with petty thief Lilly Ratnam (Jayasudha), and they fell in love. Concurrently, Shantamma reacts to Lilly by calling her as Sundari. Immediately, Krishna seeks Lilly's father, Johnson (Mukkamala), then he replies that earlier, one of his fellow burglars Jaggu (Bheema Raju), bequeathed Lilly to him. Right now, in the association of Lilly Shantamma recovers. At the same time, Jaggu returns, captures Lilly and mortgages with her real father, Ram Prasad (Prabhakar Reddy) when Krishna saves her. Thereafter he hands over to Ram Prasad, who recognises her as she resembles her mother, Sundari (again Jayasudha). Here, Krishna realises that the chair behind the fake currency is Ram Prasad. So, he decides to bolt him, progressing Krishna learns I.G. Yugandhar (Jaggayya), a candid is the real blackguard. Soon, he meets his father in prison, and he narrates the past. Indeed, Rama Rao, Ram Prasad, & Yugandhar are close friends. At a point, Rama Rao detects Ram Prasad as a gangster and rounds up him. Being cognizant of it, Yugandhar indicated Rama Rao in the crime of the same fake currency. Knowing it, Sundari decides to divulge the truth when on the ordinance of Yugandhar, Jaggu slaughtered her and absconded with Lilly. In that mishap, Shantamma lost her consciousness. Just after, Krishna makes a play, by creating better fake currency for which Yugandhar seizures Shantamma and double-crosses Ram Prasad. At last, Krishna valorously encounters him and proves his father's innocence. Finally, the movie ends on a happy note with the marriage of Krishna & Lilly.

Cast 
N. T. Rama Rao as Krishna
Jayasudha as Lilly Ratnam / Sarada & Sundari (dual role)
Satyanarayana as Head Constable Venkata Swamy / C. B. I. Officer Sadasiva Rao
Jaggayya as I. G. Yugandhar
Anjali Devi as Shantamma
Prabhakar Reddy as Ram Prasad
Mikkilineni as Inspector Rama Rao
Mukkamala as Johnson
Mada as Chitchat
P. J. Sarma as Doctor
Chalapathi Rao as Inspector Mohan Rao
Jayamalini as Dorasani Narsamma / Geetha Chowdary

Soundtrack 
Music composed by K. V. Mahadevan.

References

External links 
 

1970s action thriller films
Counterfeit money in film
Films directed by K. Raghavendra Rao
Films scored by K. V. Mahadevan
Indian action thriller films
Telugu remakes of Hindi films